Eudonia vivida is a moth in the family Crambidae. It was described by Eugene G. Munroe in 1972. It is found in North America, where it has been recorded from Alberta, British Columbia, Maine, New Hampshire, Nova Scotia and Quebec.

References

Moths described in 1972
Eudonia